Sosnovka is a rural locality (a selo) in Marksovsky District of Saratov Oblast, Russia.  Municipally, it is a part of Podlesnovskoye Rural Settlement of Marksovsky Municipal District.

History
Nineteen ethnic German families who had been lured to the area by free land originally populated the village. The land had been offered by Catherine II for two main reasons: firstly, to fill vast areas of land with subjects that could be taxed, and secondly, to create a buffer zone between Russia proper and nomads that were difficult to govern. The immigrants were Lutheran.

In 1864, the village had a trade school and a population of 642 (338 males and 304 females), living in 61 homesteads.

By 1910, the population grew to 1,883 (992 male and 891 female), living in 172 homesteads, and had a church, a parochial school, and a zemstvo school.

The German colony rapidly fell apart in the early 1900s, due to emigration, famines, wars, and deportations.

References

Rural localities in Saratov Oblast